Sammy Davis Jr. at the Cocoanut Grove is a 1963 live album by Sammy Davis Jr., recorded at the Cocoanut Grove nightclub in Los Angeles.

Track listing
 Introduction – 0:45
 "Once in a Lifetime" (Leslie Bricusse, Anthony Newley) – 2:23
 "In the Still of the Night" (Cole Porter) – 3:46
 "What Kind of Fool Am I?" (Bricusse, Newley) – 3:11
 Talk – 1:38
 "Falling in Love Again" (Frederick Hollander, Sammy Lerner) – 4:00
 Medley: "I've Got You Under My Skin"/"Big Bad John"/"Night and Day" (Porter)/(Jimmy Dean, Dean Acuff, Roy Acuff)/(Porter) – 6:32
 Meeting the President – 3:07
 West Side Story Medley: "Jet Song"/"Something's Coming"/"Cool"/"Tonight"/"America"/"Gee, Office Krupke!"/"Maria" (Leonard Bernstein, Stephen Sondheim) – 4:58
 Frank Talk – 1:11
 "River, Stay 'Way from My Door" (Mort Dixon, Harry M. Woods) – 2:30
 "Me and My Shadow" (Dave Dreyer, Al Jolson, Billy Rose) – 2:37
 Medley: "Hound Dog"/"What'd I Say" (Jerry Leiber and Mike Stoller/Ray Charles) – 3:39
 "Rock-a-Bye Your Baby with a Dixie Melody" (Sam M. Lewis, Jean Schwartz, Joe Young) – 10:22
 Sammy Looks at Old Movies – 4:45
 Finale: Jam Session ("Sam, by George") (Sammy Davis Jr., George Rhodes) – 10:30
 Sammy Says Goodnight – 2:15
 "The Birth of the Blues" (Lew Brown, Buddy DeSylva, Ray Henderson) – 1:31

Personnel 
 Sammy Davis Jr.: vocals
 George Rhodes: conductor, arranger, pianist
 Terry Rosen: guitar
 Michael Silva: drums, percussion
 Johnny Mendoza: drums, percussion

References

Sammy Davis Jr. live albums
Albums produced by Jimmy Bowen
1963 live albums
Reprise Records live albums